Open Road may refer to:

Music 
 Open Road (Donovan album), a 1970 album by Donovan and his band
 Open Road (band), the group Donovan formed to record and tour in 1970 that continues to perform after his departure 
 Open Road (Gary Barlow album), 1997 album by Gary Barlow
 "Open Road" (Gary Barlow song), the titular track from Gary Barlow's 1997 album Open Road
 Open Road (Cowboy Junkies album), a 2001 album by Cowboy Junkies
 "Open Road" (Bryan Adams song), a song from Bryan Adams' 2004 album Room Service
 "Open Road", a song from Bret Michaels' 2005 album Freedom of Sound
 The Open Road (album), a 2010 album by John Hiatt
 Open Road (The Rippingtons album), a 2019 album by The Rippingtons

Films 
 Open Road, a 2008 short film starring Andy Picheta
 The Open Road, a 2009 film written and directed by Michael Meredith
 The Open Road (1911 film), an American silent film
 Open Road (2012 film), a 2012 film directed by Márcio Garcia

Other 
 OpenROAD (Open Rapid Object Application Development), a programming language and a product of Actian Corporation
 Open Road (XM), an XM Satellite Radio channel
 Open Road Recordings, a Canadian country music record label
 Open-road racing, a form of car racing
 The Open Road for Boys, a boys' magazine from the early 20th century
 Open Road Films, an American independent motion pictures studio